Mitogen-activated protein kinase kinase (also known as MAP2K, MEK, MAPKK) is a dual-specificity kinase enzyme which phosphorylates mitogen-activated protein kinase (MAPK).

There are seven genes:
  (a.k.a. MEK1)
  (a.k.a. MEK2)
  (a.k.a. MKK3)
  (a.k.a. MKK4) 
  (a.k.a. MKK5)
  (a.k.a. MKK6)
  (a.k.a. MKK7)

The activators of p38 (MKK3 and MKK6), JNK (MKK4 and MKK7), and ERK (MEK1 and MEK2) define independent MAP kinase signal transduction pathways. The acronym MEK derives from MAPK/ERK Kinase.

Role in melanoma

MEK is a member of the MAPK signaling cascade that is activated in melanoma. When MEK is inhibited, cell proliferation is blocked and apoptosis (controlled cell death) is induced.

See also 

 Signal transduction
 MAP kinase
 MAP kinase kinase kinase
 MAP kinase kinase kinase kinase

References

External links
 

Protein kinases
EC 2.7.12
Genes associated with cancer